Qeshlaq-e Iman Quyi may refer to:
 Qeshlaq-e Iman Quyi Mohammad Jalili
 Qeshlaq-e Iman Quyi Mashhad Ali